Indonesia and Tunisia established diplomatic relations in 1960. In early 2010s, relations are particularly important following the Arab Spring, as Tunisia seeks Indonesia as an example of democracy in a Muslim-majority country, while Indonesia has expressed its willingness to support the democratic transition in Tunisia through a capacity for building and a partnership in democracy. Indonesia has described Tunisia as a shining example of a democratic transition in the Arab World. The diplomatic relations dated back to the 1950s when Indonesia supports Tunisian independence from France. Indonesia has an embassy in Tunis, while Tunisia has an embassy in Jakarta. Both countries are members of the Organisation of Islamic Cooperation and the Non-Aligned Movement.

History

The relations between Indonesia and Tunisia has been established early even before Tunisia achieved its independence from France in 1956. Tunisian freedom fighter Habib Bourguiba visited Jakarta in 1951, followed by the establishment of Tunisian independence representative office in the city in 1952 to lobby the Asian nations support for Tunisian independence.

Economic relations
The Indonesian Central Statistics Agency reported that in 2011 the trade volume reached US$100 million. The trade balance was heavily in favour to Indonesia with Indonesia's exports reaching US$84.77 million in 2010. Indonesia exports mainly consists of lubricant oil, musical instruments, optics, rubber, paper, plastics, furniture, shoes, coffee and spices to Tunisia, while the Southeast Asian country importing dates, oranges, fertilizers, rock phosphate, glass, plastics and olive oil from the North African country.

See also
 Foreign relations of Indonesia 
 Foreign relations of Tunisia

Notes

External links
Embassy of the Republic of Indonesia in Tunis, Tunisia

 
Tunisia
Bilateral relations of Tunisia